The Coupe Houphouët-Boigny is a match competition in Côte d'Ivoire football, played between the Côte d'Ivoire Premier Division champions and the Côte d'Ivoire Cup winners.

The competition is traditionally played on December 6. The official name of the trophy is Coupe Houphouët-Boigny. Starting from the 2004/05 edition, the trophy is disputed between the top 3 of the previous season and the cup winners. From the 2010/11 edition the trophy is played in the next season.

Finals
Are: 
1975 : ASEC Mimosas
1976 : Sporting Club de Gagnoa
1977 : Stella Club d'Adjamé 
1978 : Sporting Club de Gagnoa
1979 : Africa Sports
1980 : ASEC Mimosas
1981 : Africa Sports  1-0 Stella Club d'Adjamé
1982 : Africa Sports
1983 : ASEC Mimosas
1984 : Stella Club d'Adjamé
1985 : Stade d'Abidjan
1986 : Africa Sports
1987 : Africa Sports
1988 : Africa Sports
1989 : Africa Sports
1990 : ASEC Mimosas
1991 : Africa Sports
1992 not played
1993 : Africa Sports
1994 : ASEC Mimosas            4-2 Stade d'Abidjan    [aet]
1995 : ASEC Mimosas            4-4 Stade d'Abidjan    [ASEC on pen]
1996 : SOA
1997 : ASEC Mimosas            3-0 Africa Sports
1998 : ASEC Mimosas            2-0 Africa Sports
1999 : ASEC Mimosas            2-1 Africa Sports
2000-02 not played
2003 : Africa Sports           1-1 Stella Club d'Adjamé   [4-2 pen]
2004 : ASEC Mimosas            2-1 Stella Club d'Adjamé
2005 : Séwé Sport     4-1 Jeunesse Club d'Abidjan
2006 : ASEC Mimosas            1-0 Denguélé Sport
2007 : ASEC Mimosas            3-0 Issia Wazi FC
2008 : ASEC Mimosas
2009 : ASEC Mimosas
2010 : Jeunesse Club d'Abidjan 1-1 ASEC Mimosas [4-3 pen]
2011 : ASEC Mimosas            2-1 Africa Sports
2012 : Séwé Sport 4-0 Stella Club d'Adjamé
2013 : Séwé Sport 1-0 ASEC Mimosas
2014 : Séwé Sport 2-0 ASEC Mimosas
2015 : Africa Sports 1-0 AS Tanda
2016 : AS Tanda 2-1 Séwé Sport
2017 : ASEC Mimosas 1-0 Africa Sports
2018 : Stade d'Abidjan 2-1 SC Gagnoa
2019 : SOA 3-0 FC San Pédro

References

Ivory
SuperCup